Maks Juraj Čelić (born 8 March 1996) is a Croatian footballer who plays as a defender for Bulgarian club Beroe.

Career
At the age of 18, Juraj Čelić signed for German second division side MSV Duisburg after Bayer 04 Leverkusen, who he was supposed to join, dissolved their reserves. After failing to make an appearance for MSV Duisburg, he almost joined GNK Dinamo Zagreb, Croatia's most successful club, but the transfer never happened. 

In 2017, Juraj Čelić signed for NK Varaždin, helping them achieve promotion from the Croatian third division to the top flight.

In 2020, he signed for Lviv in the Ukrainian top flight.

On 24 August 2021, he signed with Italian Serie C club ACR Messina.

Honours
Varaždin
 Druga HNL: 2018–19

References

External links
 Maks Juraj Čelić at Soccerway

1996 births
Living people
Footballers from Zagreb
Croatian footballers
Association football defenders
MSV Duisburg players
Croatian Football League players
First Football League (Croatia) players
NK Varaždin players
HNK Gorica players
Ukrainian Premier League players
FC Lviv players
Serie C players
A.C.R. Messina players
PFC Beroe Stara Zagora players
Croatian expatriate footballers
Croatian expatriate sportspeople in Germany
Croatian expatriate sportspeople in Ukraine
Croatian expatriate sportspeople in Italy
Expatriate footballers in Germany
Expatriate footballers in Ukraine
Expatriate footballers in Italy
Expatriate footballers in Bulgaria